Devarakonda Vittal Rao (14 November 1947 – 28 May 2016) was a member of the 14th Lok Sabha of India. He represented the Mahabubnagar constituency of Andhra Pradesh and was a member of the Indian National Congress (INC) political party.

Early life
His father, Sayappa, was a herbal doctor in a remote village called Lagacharla in Mahbubnagar District of Andhra Pradesh; his mother, Thimamma, was a housewife. He completed his M.A. and also served as a student leader.

Career
He moved up the political ranks from Joint Secretary to Treasurer of the Andhra Pradesh Congress Committee to Member of the Lok Sabha, the lower house of the Parliament of India.

Death
On 28 May 2016 he died. His family declared it as a normal death.

References

External links
 Home Page on the Parliament of India's Website

1947 births
2016 deaths
People from Telangana
Telangana politicians
Indian National Congress politicians
People from Mahbubnagar district
India MPs 2004–2009
Telugu politicians
Lok Sabha members from Andhra Pradesh
Indian National Congress politicians from Andhra Pradesh